Sakala may refer to:

Places
 Sagala, a city of ancient India, another name Sangala
 Sakala, Sagala or Sangala, the ancient Greek name for the modern city of Sialkot in present-day Pakistan
 Sakala County, an ancient county in Estonia (nowadays for the most part Viljandi County)

 Sakala, Nepal, a city in Nepal

Other
 Sakala (academic corporation), an Estonian academic corporation
 Sakala (newspaper), an Estonian newspaper
 Sakala (surname)
 EML Sakala (M314), a Sandown-class minehunter of the Estonian Navy
 Sakala Services Act, Karnataka

See also